Friedrich Kipp (1814 – 21 January 1869) was a German physician and entomologist.

References
Anonym 1869: [Kipp, F.] Vereinsbl. westph.rhein. Ver. Bienenzucht und Seidenbau 20:17-18.

German entomologists
1814 births
1869 deaths
People involved with the periodic table